is a Japanese voice actress from Chiba Prefecture, Japan. She is known for her role as Sakura Matō in Fate/stay night series.

Voice roles

Anime television

2000
 Hamtaro, Sumire-chan, Tsutomu-kun

2001
 Parappa the Rapper Gallery (ep 17)
 Alien Nine (special), Kasumi Tōmine

2002
 Mirage of Blaze (ep 4)
 Tokyo Underground May (eps 7–9)
 Mirmo Zibang! Hanzo, Umezono Momo
 Shrine of the Morning Mist(ep 24)
 Petite Princess Yucie Girl 1 (ep 2), Student C (ep 8)
 Naruto Moegi

2003
 Mermaid Melody: Pichi Pichi Pitch Coral Spirit (ep 36), Mimi
 D.C. ~Da Capo~ Emi
 Popotan Girl A (ep 1)
 Massugu ni Ikou Saotome Nao
 Requiem from the Darkness Chiyoko (ep 9)
 Rumbling Hearts Schoolgirl B (ep 3)
 Maburaho Raika Naruo

2004
 Maria-sama ga Miteru Katsura
 Daphne in the Brilliant Blue Nurse
 Kannazuki no Miko Himeko Kurusugawa
 Kyo Kara Maoh! Beatrice (eps 56–78)
 The Marshmallow Times Classmate
 Galaxy Angel X Toshio (ep 6)
 One Piece Arbell Achino
 Elfen Lied Girl (eps 8–9)
 Bleach Ururu Tsumugiya
 Gakuen Alice Student A (ep 20)

2005
 Ah! My Goddess Goddess, Hijiri, real estate agent (ep 6)
 Emma: A Victorian Romance Collin Jones
 Glass Mask Dancer (ep 1), Keiko Tanaka (ep 16), Suzuki (eps 2–3)
 Tsubasa: Reservoir Chronicle Kotoko (ep 22)
 Majokko Tsukune-chan Himeko Kensennuma
 Rockman EXE Beast Trill
 Hell Girl, Miki Kawakami (ep 18)
 Fate/stay night, Sakura Matou

2006
 Fushigiboshi no Futagohime Gyu! Rosemary
 Air Gear Mari Tomita
 Gintama Girl (ep 21)
 Ah! My Goddess: Flights of Fancy Hijiri
 Kirarin Revolution Fubuki Toudou, Mii-tyan
 Coyote Ragtime Show Chelsea
 Onegai My Melody: KuruKuru Shuffle! Bako
 Fate/stay night Sakura Matō
 Pocket Monsters Diamond and Pearl Suzuna
 D.Gray-man Young Guzol (ep 5)
 Buso Renkin Saori Kawai

2007
 Shattered Angels Himiko
 Deltora Quest Francoise (eps 22–23)
 Venus Versus Virus Kyouko
 Naruto Shippūden Moegi
 Gurren Lagann Maosha
 Touka Gettan Suzume
 Kamichama Karin (2007), Himeka Kujyou
 Emma: A Victorian Romance Second Act Collin Jones
 Mameushi-kun Azuki
 Shugo Chara! Maika Himekawa (ep 6)

2008
 Kanokon Iku Sahara
 S · A: Special A Sayo (ep 14), Yui Oikawa (eps 13–14)
 Kyōran Kazoku Nikki Milcatopy
 Linebarrels of Iron Risako Niiyama
 Shugo Chara!! Doki— Nayuta Kusanagi (ep 67)
 Kurokami: The Animation Kuro

2009
 Cross Game Momiji Tsukishima

2010
 Jewelpet Peridot
 Heartcatch Precure! Kasumi

2011
 Infinite Stratos Maya Yamada
 Gosick Avril Bradley
 Kore wa Zombie Desu ka? Kyōko
 Chibi Devi! Mao
 Maken-ki! Haruko Amaya

2013
 Pocket Monsters XY Viola, Serena's Yancham

2014
 Fate/stay night: Unlimited Blade Works Sakura Matō
 Girl Friend BETA Remi Tamai
 Witch Craft Works Rinon Otometachibana

2015
 Pocket Monsters: XY&Z Serena's Yancham
 Yatterman Night Yatter Soldier B

2016
 Magical Girl Raising Project Koyuki's mother
 Tales of Zestiria the X Lailah
 Fate/kaleid liner Prisma Illya 3rei!! Sakura Matō

2017Tales of Zestiria the X Season 2 LailahBoruto: Naruto Next Generation Moegi

2021The Case Study of Vanitas Amelia Ruth

2022To Your Eternity Season 2 Alma

 Original video animations 
 .hack//Intermezzo (2002)
 Psychic Academy (2002), Rusho
 Kaleido Star Legend of the Phoenix (2005), Girl
 Magical Witch Punie-chan (2006), Tetsuko Koku
 Baldr Force EXE Resolution (2006), Ren Mizusaka
 Carnival Phantasm (2011), Sakura Matō, Grail-kun

 Anime movies 
 Bleach: Memories of Nobody (2006), Ururu Tsumugiya
 Eiga de Tōjō! Tamagotchi Dokidoki! Uchū no Maigotchi!? (2007), Tanpopo
 Bleach: The DiamondDust Rebellion (2007), Ururu Tsumugiya
 Bleach: Fade to Black (2008), Ururu Tsumugiya
 Fate/stay night: Unlimited Blade Works (2010), Sakura Matō
 Pokémon the Movie XY - The Archdjinni of the Rings: Hoopa (2015), Serena's Yancham
 Pokémon the Movie XY&Z: Volcanion and the Exquisite Magearna (2016), Serena's Yancham
 Fate/kaleid liner Prisma Illya: Oath Under Snow (2017), Sakura Matō
 Fate/stay night: Heaven's Feel I. presage flower (2017), Sakura Matō
 Fate/stay night: Heaven's Feel II. lost butterfly (2019), Sakura Matō
 Fate/stay night: Heaven's Feel III. spring song (2020), Sakura Matō

 Video games 
 Ever 17: The Out of Infinity (2002, 2011), You Tanaka
 Final Fantasy II remake (2002), Maria
 Fate/stay night (2004), Sakura Matō
 Fate/Unlimited Codes (2008), Sakura Matō
 Otomedius (2007), Eru Tron
 Final Fantasy IV remake (2007), Rydia
 Trinity Universe (2009), Viorate Platane
 Final Fantasy Crystal Chronicles: The Crystal Bearers (2009), Althea
 Fate/Grand Order (2017), BB, Parvati, Qin Liangyu, Kama 
 Granblue Fantasy (2019), Nier
 Azur Lane (2019), Glorious, Tallinn
 Fuga: Melodies of Steel 2 (2023) (Sheena Falafel)

 Dubbing roles 
 Thomas and Friends'' (Bill and Ben (Season 9 onwards, succeeding Tomoko Naka and Hiromi Nishida))

Other appearances

Radio 

 (August 30, 2006 – present)

References

External links
 Official agency profile 
 Noriko Shitaya at Ryu's Seiyuu Info
 

1982 births
Living people
Japanese video game actresses
Japanese voice actresses
Voice actresses from Chiba Prefecture
81 Produce voice actors
21st-century Japanese actresses